The Independent Karbala Coalition is an electoral list which competed in the December 2005 Iraqi legislative election

Member parties
Dr. Abbass Naser Hasani Al Hasnawi.
National Gathering For Karbala Iraqi Tribes

Electoral lists for Iraqi elections
Political party alliances in Iraq